William Sterling Cole (April 18, 1904 – March 15, 1987) was an American politician, lawyer, and civil servant who served as the first Director General of the International Atomic Energy Agency from 1957 to 1961. Before his appointment to the IAEA he was a Republican member of the United States House of Representatives from New York.

Biography
W. Sterling Cole was born in Painted Post, New York. He graduated from Colgate University in 1925 and Albany Law School in 1929. Cole practiced law in Bath, New York.

A Republican, Cole was elected to Congress in 1934 and served from January 3, 1935 until his resignation on December 1, 1957. Cole voted in favor of the Civil Rights Act of 1957. He resigned to become the first Director General of the International Atomic Energy Agency and remained at that post until 1961.

After leaving the IAEA Cole resided in Arlington, Virginia and practiced law in Washington, D.C.  He died in Washington on March 15, 1987.

References

Sources

External links

 
C-SPAN
W. Sterling Cole Papers, Cornell University

1904 births
1987 deaths
Albany Law School alumni
Colgate University alumni
Directors General of the International Atomic Energy Agency
People from Painted Post, New York
Republican Party members of the United States House of Representatives from New York (state)
20th-century American politicians